Stephanie Callaghan (born 24 April 1971) is a Scottish politician who has been the Member of the Scottish Parliament (MSP) for Uddingston and Bellshill since May 2021. A member of the Scottish National Party (SNP), she was a councillor for South Lanarkshire, representing the Hamilton North and East ward from 2016 to 2022.

Early life and career 
Callaghan was born in Hamilton, South Lanarkshire. She attended the University of Strathclyde. She worked as a manager for Holland and Barrett and took on trainees through Right Track, an organisation assisting young people find jobs and learn skills. She then went on to work for the organisation as a placement officer and then a project coordinator. In her roles, she helped early school leavers and long-term unemployed young people to find jobs.

Political career

Early political years 
While at university in the late 1980s, Callaghan joined the Scottish Labour Party when she was 18. She has campaigned against the Poll Tax and student loans. In the aftermath of the Yes Scotland campaign's defeat in the 2014 Scottish independence referendum, she joined the Scottish National Party.

Callaghan was elected to South Lanarkshire Council on 21 January 2016 in a by-election for the Hamilton North and East ward, following the death of Lynn Adams. She was re-elected in the following year's Scottish local elections.

Scottish Parliament 
On 8 May 2021, she was elected as Member of the Scottish Parliament (MSP) for Uddingston and Bellshill.

References

External links
 
 Personal website

1971 births
Living people
Scottish National Party councillors
Members of the Scottish Parliament 2021–2026
Scottish National Party MSPs
Female members of the Scottish Parliament
Politicians from Hamilton, South Lanarkshire
Councillors in South Lanarkshire
Women councillors in Scotland